Crime and Punishment (French: Crime et châtiment) is a 1935 French crime drama film directed by Pierre Chenal and produced by Michel Kagansky starring Harry Baur, Pierre Blanchar and Madeleine Ozeray. It is an adaptation of the 1866 novel of the same name by Fyodor Dostoevsky. The same year a separate American film adaptation was made featuring Peter Lorre.

The film's sets were designed by the art director Aimé Bazin. Chenal rejected Bazin's original designs as too realistic and historically faithful, as he wished to create a more expressionist ambience for the film.

Critical reception
Writing for The Spectator in 1936, Graham Greene gave the film a moderately good review, praising the direction and the camerawork particularly during the murder scene, the fidelity of the film to the text upon which it was based, and the acting of Pierre Blanchar in portraying Raskolnikov. Of Harry Bauer's portrayal of Porphyrius, Greene described the acting as "a lovely performance, the finest I have seen in the cinema this year". For Greene, the major problem with the film was that by converting it into a film in the third party instead of approaching the tale from within Raskolnikov's mind, the film was necessarily curtailed.

Cast
Harry Baur as Porphyre
Pierre Blanchar as Rodion Raskolnikov
Madeleine Ozeray as Sonia
Lucienne Le Marchand as Dounia
Marcelle Géniat as Mme Raskolnikov
Alexandre Rignault as Razoumikhine
Sylvie as Catherine Ivanova
Aimé Clariond as Loujine
 as Aliona
Georges Douking as Nicolas
Marcel Delaître as Marmeladov
Catherine Hessling as Elisabeth
Daniel Gilbert as Zamiatov
 as Polia
 as Lieutenant Poudre
 as Le Borgne
 as Commissioner's assistant
 as Nastassia 
Léon Larive as Koch
Charles Lemontier as Pestriakov

References

External links

1930s historical drama films
French historical drama films
1935 crime drama films
French crime drama films
Films based on Crime and Punishment
French black-and-white films
Films scored by Arthur Honegger
Films set in the 19th century
Films set in Saint Petersburg
Films with screenplays by Marcel Aymé
1930s French films
1930s French-language films